Armin Meier (born 3 November 1969) is a Swiss former cyclist. He was involved the Festina affair, and was part of the team that was disqualified from the 1998 Tour de France. Despite never testing positive for any drugs, he admitted to the use of EPO throughout his career. He was the Swiss National Road Race champion in 1996 and 1999. He also competed in the individual road race at the 1992 Summer Olympics.

Major results

1989
 1st Hegiberg-Rundfahrt
1992
 2nd Road race, National Amateur Road Championships
1993
 1st Tour du Canton de Genève
1994
 1st Stausee-Rundfahrt Klingnau
1995
 1st Prologue Tour de Normandie
1996
 1st  Road race, National Road Championships
 1st Stage 3 Uniqa Classic
 2nd Gran Premio di Lugano
 7th Josef Voegeli Memorial
 7th Overall Grand Prix Guillaume Tell
 7th Overall Regio-Tour
 9th Overall Tour de Suisse
 10th Overall Tour de Normandie
1997
 2nd Josef Voegeli Memorial
 3rd Overall Grand Prix Guillaume Tell
 6th GP de Fourmies
 7th Overall Giro di Sardegna
1998
 2nd Road race, National Road Championships
 3rd Josef Voegeli Memorial 
 4th Overall Grand Prix Guillaume Tell
1999
 1st  Road race, National Road Championships
 7th Overall Grand Prix du Midi Libre
2000
 5th Josef Voegeli Memorial
2001
 9th GP du canton d'Argovie

Grand Tour general classification results timeline

References

External links

1969 births
Living people
Swiss male cyclists
Cyclists at the 1992 Summer Olympics
Olympic cyclists of Switzerland
Doping cases in cycling
Sportspeople from the canton of Lucerne